Roman Lyabikhov (born 7 May 1973, Severodvinsk, Arkhangelsk Oblast) is a Russian political figure and a deputy of the 7th and 8th State Dumas.
 
From 1995 to 2013, Lyabikhov served as a director of several industrial enterprises in Severodvinsk, including Arnika LLC, Arsenal NPF, Plant of Chemical Reagents LLC NPO. From 2013 to 2017, he was the General Director of Management Company Leader Group. From 2020 to 2021, he was the deputy of the 7th State Duma as he received the mandate of deputy Aleksandr Nekrasov. On October 9, 2020, Lyabikhov was appointed senator of the Federation Council from the Arkhangelsk Oblast constituency. Since September 2021, he has served as deputy of the 8th State Duma.

References
 

 

1973 births
Living people
Communist Party of the Russian Federation members
21st-century Russian politicians
Eighth convocation members of the State Duma (Russian Federation)
Seventh convocation members of the State Duma (Russian Federation)
People from Severodvinsk